The 2006–07 Chappell–Hadlee Trophy was the third Chappell–Hadlee Trophy, a three-match ODI series between Australia and New Zealand. The series was played in New Zealand between 16 February and 20 February 2007.

New Zealand beat the Australians 3–0 in the series. The Australians were without some of their leading players for this short tour. After the series, Australia went on a losing streak of five matches, which included the final of the Commonwealth Bank Series in 2007.

Fixtures

1st ODI

2nd ODI

3rd ODI

Squads

References

External links
 Tournament home at Cricinfo

Chappell-Hadlee Trophy 2006-07
Australian cricket tours of New Zealand
International cricket competitions in 2006–07
2007 in Australian cricket
2007 in New Zealand cricket